The 2014–15 Boston College Eagles women's basketball team will represent Boston College during the 2014–15 college basketball season. Erik Johnson resumes the responsibility as head coach for a third consecutive season. The Eagles, members of the Atlantic Coast Conference, will play their home games at the Conte Forum. They finished the season 13–17, 5–11 in ACC play to finish in twelfth place. They lost in the first round of the ACC women's tournament to Wake Forest.

Before the season

Departures

2014–15 media

Boston College IMG Sports Network Affiliates
Select BC games, mostly home games and conference road games, will be broadcast on ZBC Sports. BC Game notes and stories will continue to be posted through their athletic website and on Twitter by following @bc_wbb.

Roster

Schedule

|-
!colspan=9 style="background:#660000; color:#E7D692;"|Regular Season

|-
!colspan=9 style="background:#E7D692;"| 2015 ACC Tournament

Rankings
2014–15 NCAA Division I women's basketball rankings

See also
 Boston College Eagles women's basketball

References

Boston College Eagles women's basketball seasons
Boston College
Boston College Eagles women's basketball
Boston College Eagles women's basketball
Boston College Eagles women's basketball
Boston College Eagles women's basketball